Jenapur Road railway station is a railway station on Kharagpur–Puri line in East Coast Railway zone under Khurda Road railway division of Indian Railways. The station is situated at Kharikera, Jenapur in Puri district of the Indian state of Odisa.

History
As the branch of Howrah–Chennai main line, the Khurda Road– section was opened to traffic on 1 February 1897. The complete track became doubled in July 2015.

References

Khurda Road railway division
Railway stations in Puri district